The Ka'apor are an indigenous people of Brazil. They live on a protected reserve in the state of Maranhão. They were the subject of a book by anthropologist Dr. William Balée in an exhaustive study of their ethnobotany lifeways and the historical ecology of the area they currently inhabit.
 
They live in a heavily deforested area of Pre-Amazonian forest, but have managed to protect the forest within their designated reserve.

There is a high degree of congenital deafness among the Ka'apor, and consequently most of the hearing community knows sign language. (See Ka'apor Sign Language.)

Their forest reserve is under attack from illegal loggers, and in September 2014 the tribe took matters into their own hands when they attacked a group of loggers, tying them up, humiliating them before destroying the logs that had been extracted from the forest and burning the logger's lorry, before eventually setting them free.

Notes

References
Balée, William	1994 Footprints of the Forest: Ka’apor Ethnobotany—the Historical Ecology of Plant Utilization by an Amazonian People. New York: Columbia University Press.
Ka'apor warriors in the Amazon confront illegal loggers, The Telegraph

Indigenous peoples in Brazil
Indigenous peoples of the Amazon